This is a list of capital ships (battleships, ironclads and coastal defence ships) of minor navies:

Argentina
 
  (1874)
  (1874)
 
  (1880)
 
  (1891)
  (1892) - named Nueve de Julio when ordered
 
  (1911) - Broken up 1950s
  (1911) - Broken up 1950s

Australia (Victoria colony until 1901)
  (1814, ex-, transferred 1867 to Victoria) - Cut down to frigate, broken up 1928
  (1868) - Scuttled as breakwater 1926
  (1913) - Scuttled in 1924

Brazil

Ships of the line
 Vasco da Gama 74-80 (c. 1792, ex-Portuguese, captured 1822)
 Medusa 68-74 (c. 1786, ex-Portuguese, captured 1822, ex-Nossa Senhora do Monte do Carmo, renamed 1793)
 Afonso de Albuquerque 62-64 (c. 1767, ex-Portuguese, captured 1822, ex-Nossa Senhora dos Prazeres, renamed 1796/97) - Discarded, 1826
 Principe Real 90 (1771), ex-Portuguese, captured 1822, ex-Nossa Senhora da Conceicão, renamed 1794)
 ? 74 (c. 1763, ex-Portuguese Conde Dom Henrique, captured 1822, ex-Nossa Senhora do Pilar, renamed 1793)
 Pedro I 64-74 (c. 1763, ex-Portuguese Martin de Freitas, acquired 1822, ex-Infante dom Pedro, renamed 1806, ex-Santo António e São José, renamed 1794; renamed Pedro I)
 ? 64-72 (c. 1766, ex-Portuguese Dom Joao de Castro, acquired 1822, ex-Nossa Senhora do Bom Sucesso, renamed 1800)
Coast defence ships
 Barroso (1864) - Broken up 1885
 Brasil (1864) - Broken up 1905
 Tamandaré (1865) - Broken up 1885
 Lima Barros (1865) - Intended as Paraguayan Bellona, renamed 1865, broken up 1905
 Rio de Janeiro (c. 1865) - Mined 1866
 Bahia (1865) - Intended as Paraguayan Minerva, renamed 1865, broken up 1895
 Silvado (1866) - Intended as Paraguayan Nemesis, renamed 1865, discarded c. 1885, broken up 1895
 
 Mariz e Barros (1866) - Discarded 1890, broken up 1892
 Herval (1866) - Discarded 1885, broken up 1887
 
 Cabral (1866) - Discarded 1885, broken up 1887
 Colombo (1866) - Discarded 1885, broken up 1887
 Sete de Setembro (1874) - Discarded, broken up 1895
 
 Javary (1873) - Sank 1893
 Solimões (1874) - Broken up during the 1890s
 Independencia - Confiscated by Britain before delivery, renamed 
  (1883) - Sunk 1910
  (1885) - Renamed Vinte Quatro de Mayo 1894, renamed Aquidabã 1900, sunk 1906
 
  (1898) - To Mexico 1924, renamed Anahuac
  (1899) - Discarded, broken up 1936
Dreadnoughts
 
  (1910) - Broken up 1954
  (1910) - Sank in storm while being towed to breakers 1951
 Riachuelo - planned super-dreadnought, ordered but canceled after the beginning of the First World War

Chile
 
 Almirante Cochrane (1874) - Broken up c. 1935
 Valparaiso (1875), renamed as Blanco Encalada in 1877 - Torpedoed 1891
 Huáscar (1865, ex-Peruvian Huáscar, captured 1879) - preserved at Talcahuano
 Capitan Prat (1890)
  (not handed over)
 Constitución (1903) - Confiscated by Britain 1903, renamed , sold for breaking up 1920
 Libertad (1903) - Confiscated by Britain 1903, renamed , torpedoed 1915
 
  (1913) - purchased by Britain 1914 and renamed , repurchased 1920, broken up 1959
 Almirante Cochrane (1913) - purchased by Britain 1918, renamed  and converted to aircraft carrier, sunk 1942

China
 Dingyuan class
 Dingyuan (1881) - Sunk 1895
 Zhenyuan (1882) - Captured by Japan 1895, broken up 1910
Pingyuan (1890) - Captured by Japan 1894, sunk 1904

Colombia
 ? (1785, ex-Swedish Tapperheten 60, transferred 1825) - To Portugal by 1848

India (British colony)
 Magdala (1870)

Finland
Väinämöinen-class
Väinämöinen (1932) - Transferred to Soviet Union 1947
Ilmarinen (1934) - Sunk by mines 1941

Mexico
Ship of the line
 Congreso Mexicano (1789, ex-Spanish Asia, mutinied and handed over 1825) - Broken up 1830

Coastal defence ship
 Anahuac (1898, ex-Brazilian Marshal Deodoro, obtained 1924)

Norway
Coastal defence ships serving, or ordered for, the Royal Norwegian Navy:
 
 Tordenskjold (1897) - Captured by Germany 1940 and renamed Nymphe, reverted 1945, BU 1948
 Harald Haarfagre (1897) - Captured by Germany 1940 and renamed Thetis, reverted 1945, BU 1948
 
 Norge (1900) - Torpedoed 1940
 Eidsvold (1900) - Torpedoed 1940
 
 Bjørgvin (1912) - Confiscated by the British Navy and renamed , blew up
 Nidaros (1912) - Confiscated by the British Navy and renamed

Peru
 Independencia (1865) - Wrecked 1879
 Huáscar (1865) - Captured by Chile 1879, preserved at Talcahuano

Thailand
Thonburi-class
Thonburi (1938) - Struck 1959
Sri Ayudhya (1938) - Sunk 1951 during the Manhattan Rebellion

Ukraine
All Ukrainian battleships were previously part of the Russian Black Sea Fleet and were subsequently taken over by the Soviet Union
Evstafi-class 
Evstafi
Ioann Zlatoust
Rostislav
Soborna Ukraina

Yugoslavia
Tegetthoff-class
Jugoslavija (1918) - Transferred on 31 October 1918 from the Austro-Hungarian Navy, sunk by Italian frogmen on the following day
Kumbor (1919) - War reparation from Austria-Hungary, scrapped 1922

Minor navies